Ernest Henry Meyer (June 23, 1904 – January 23, 1979) was an American football player. He played college football for Geneva College and in the National Football League (NFL) as a guard for the Portsmouth Spartans in 1930. He appeared in nine NFL games, five as a starter.

References

1904 births
1979 deaths
Geneva Golden Tornadoes football players
Portsmouth Spartans players
Players of American football from Pennsylvania